Nasiru Zakaria Banahene (born 8 July 2000) is a Ghanaian footballer who plays as a right-back for Finnish club Honka

Career

Early life
Born in Accra, Banahene started his career at the age of 9 with local club Kumasi Barcelona Football Club based in Kumasi, Ghana. He was there with childhood friend Mohammed Salisu. Banahene then moved to Ocheman Planners before progressing on to the youth academy of Accra-based club Liberty Professionals.

MTK Budapest
In February 2019, he joined Hungarian club MTK Budapest. However, MTK decided to loan Banahene out during the summer due to a lack of playing time.

FC Honka
On 9 August 2019, Banahene joined Finnish club Honka on an initial loan deal for the rest of 2019 with an option to buy. In July 2020, Honka exercised their buy option with Banahene signing a three-year deal.

Club statistics

References

2000 births
Living people
Ghanaian footballers
Association football defenders
Nemzeti Bajnokság I players
Veikkausliiga players
Kakkonen players
MTK Budapest FC players
FC Honka players
Ghanaian expatriate footballers
Expatriate footballers in Hungary
Expatriate footballers in Finland
Ghanaian expatriate sportspeople in Hungary
Ghanaian expatriate sportspeople in Finland
Footballers from Accra